Clifton L. Forbes (February 18, 1946 – March 1, 2010) was an Olympic athlete, who represented Jamaica at the 1968 Summer Olympics in Mexico City. He won a bronze medal in the 4×400 metre relay at the 1967 Pan American Games.

Later he served as a manager for teams to  the Olympic, Commonwealth, Pan American, Central America and Caribbean Games, and a trainer of the national netball team.

Death
On March 1, 2010, Forbes died at the age of 64 after a long illness.

References
 Clifton Forbes' obituary at the Jamaica Gleaner
 
 Clifton Forbes' obituary at the Jamaica Star

1946 births
2010 deaths
Jamaican male sprinters
Commonwealth Games competitors for Jamaica
Athletes (track and field) at the 1966 British Empire and Commonwealth Games
Athletes (track and field) at the 1970 British Commonwealth Games
Pan American Games bronze medalists for Jamaica
Pan American Games medalists in athletics (track and field)
Athletes (track and field) at the 1967 Pan American Games
Olympic athletes of Jamaica
Athletes (track and field) at the 1968 Summer Olympics
Central American and Caribbean Games gold medalists for Jamaica
Competitors at the 1966 Central American and Caribbean Games
Central American and Caribbean Games medalists in athletics
Medalists at the 1967 Pan American Games